Gia Scala (born Josephine Grace Johanna Scoglio; March 3, 1934 – April 30, 1972) was a British-American actress.

Early life
Scala was born March 3, 1934, in Liverpool, England, to Sicilian father Pietro Scoglio, and Irish mother Eileen O'Sullivan. She had one sister, Tina Scala, also an actress.

Scala was brought up in Messina and Mili San Marco in Sicily, the latter on the estate of her grandfather, Natale Scoglio, who was one of the largest citrus growers in Sicily. When Scala was 16, she moved to the United States to live with her aunt Agata in Whitestone, Queens, New York City. After graduating from Bayside High School, she moved to Manhattan to pursue acting. Scala supported herself by working at a travel agency.

While she worked during the day for airlines and an insurance agency, Scala studied acting at night, with Stella Adler among her teachers. She met Steve McQueen, whom she dated from 1952 to 1954. Scala began to appear on game shows, including Stop the Music, where she was spotted by Maurice Bergman, an executive of Universal International located in New York City.

Career

In 1954, accompanied by her mother, Scala flew to Los Angeles to screen test for the role of Mary Magdalene in The Gallileans. Although she did not get the part, Peter Johnson at Universal Studios was impressed with Scala's screen test. Scala had her first official job in Hollywood when she was given a non-speaking, uncredited part in the movie All That Heaven Allows, starring Rock Hudson. Despite her minor role in the movie, Universal Studios signed her to a contract, dyed her hair dark brown, had her four front teeth capped, and gave her the stage name Gia Scala.

Songwriter Henry Mancini met Scala on the set of Four Girls in Town. Inspired by her beauty, he wrote "Cha Cha for Gia", which appeared uncredited in the 1957 film.

Scala became emotionally distraught following the death of her mother in 1957. In 1958, she became a naturalized American citizen. Scala soon after landed roles in such films as Tip on a Dead Jockey (1957), The Garment Jungle (1957), The Tunnel of Love (1958), and The Guns of Navarone (1961), starring Gregory Peck and David Niven.

Scala made frequent appearances on American television during the 1960s, appearing in such series as Alfred Hitchcock Presents, Convoy, The Islanders, The Rogues, Voyage to the Bottom of the Sea, Twelve O'Clock High, Tarzan, and It Takes a Thief (1969) in the episode "The Artist Is for Framing", her final acting role.

Later years
On August 21, 1959, Scala married Don Burnett, an actor turned investment banker. After 11 years of marriage they divorced on September 1, 1970, and Burnett married actress Barbara Anderson. Scala had difficulties with alcohol and her career began to wane.

In 2015, author/researcher Sterling Saint James wrote a book about Gia Scala's life titled Gia Scala: The First Gia. Tina Scala provided intimate details about her sister's life.

Death
On the night of April 30, 1972, 38-year-old Scala was found dead in her Hollywood Hills home. Los Angeles County Coroner Thomas Noguchi reported her cause of death was from accidental "acute ethanol and barbiturate intoxication".

Scala is interred in the Holy Cross Cemetery in Culver City, California.

Film and television credits

Notes

References

External links

 
 
 gettyimages

1934 births
1972 deaths
20th-century English actresses
Accidental deaths in California
Actresses from Liverpool
Alcohol-related deaths in California
Bayside High School (Queens) alumni
Burials at Holy Cross Cemetery, Culver City
English emigrants to the United States
English film actresses
English people of Italian descent
English people of Irish descent
English people of Sicilian descent
English television actresses
Naturalized citizens of the United States
People from Whitestone, Queens